Bill Khayat (born March 26, 1973) is an American football coach and former collegiate and professional tight end who is the tight ends, and running backs coach for the Pittsburgh Maulers of the United States Football League (USFL). Khayat is the head football coach at Brevard College.

Playing career
After going undrafted, Khayat was on the practice squads of the Kansas City Chiefs (1996) and the Carolina Panthers (1997), and in 1998 he played for the Barcelona Dragons of NFL Europe.

Head coaching record

References

External links
 Brevard profile

1973 births
Living people
American football tight ends
Arizona Cardinals coaches
Barcelona Dragons players
Brevard Tornados football coaches
Duke Blue Devils football players
Sacramento Mountain Lions coaches
Tennessee State Tigers football coaches
Washington Redskins coaches
Sportspeople from York, Pennsylvania
Players of American football from Camden, New Jersey
Coaches of American football from Pennsylvania
Players of American football from Pennsylvania
Pittsburgh Maulers (2022) coaches